Plouguerneau is a commune in the Finistère department of Brittany in north-western France.

Geography
Municipality located between the right bank of the coastal river Aber-Wrac'h and the English Channel, Plouguerneau is made up of three towns: Plouguerneau in the center of the municipality, Lilia to the west facing the sea and Le Grouanec to the east facing land. It is located in the heart of the Pays pagan and the Pays des Abers.

Plouguerneau has 45 kilometers of coastline, islands included (it is the town in France with the longest coastline); it is also the capital of seaweed harvesters.

International relations
The commune is twinned with a number of villages in South East Cornwall, England, including:
  St Germans, UK
  Tideford, UK

Population
Inhabitants of Plouguerneau are called in French Plouguernéens.

Breton language
In 2008, 12.52% of primary-school children attended bilingual schools, where Breton language is taught alongside French.

See also
Communes of the Finistère department

References

External links

Official website 

Mayors of Finistère Association 

Communes of Finistère